Thrasya is a genus of Neotropical plants in the grass family.

 Species
 Thrasya achlysophila Soderstr. - Guyana
 Thrasya auricoma A.G.Burm. - Brazil
 Thrasya axillaris (Swallen) A.G.Burm. ex Judz. - Brazil, Suriname, Venezuela
 Thrasya campylostachya (Hack.) Chase - Mexico (Puebla, Veracruz, Tabasco, Oaxaca, Chiapas), Central America, Colombia, Venezuela
 Thrasya crucensis Killeen - Bolivia
 Thrasya glaziovii A.G.Burm. - Brazil
 Thrasya granitica A.G.Burm. - Suriname
 Thrasya hitchcockii Chase - Costa Rica, Panamá, Venezuela
 Thrasya longiligulata M.Bastos & A.G.Burm. - Brazil
 Thrasya mosquitiensis Davidse & A.G.Burm. - Honduras, Nicaragua
 Thrasya oreophila A.G.Burm. - Minas Gerais
 Thrasya parvula A.G.Burm. - Pará
 Thrasya paspaloides Kunth  - Brazil, Venezuela (Amazonas, Bolívar), La Mosquitia of Honduras, Trinidad & Tobago
 Thrasya petrosa (Trin.) Chase - Brazil
 Thrasya robusta Hitchc. & Chase - Trinidad & Tobago, Venezuela, Suriname, Fr Guiana, Colombia, Costa Rica
 Thrasya scandens (Tutin) Soderstr. ex A.G.Burm. - Suriname, Fr Guiana, Guyana
 Thrasya schumannii (Pilg.) Pilg. - Brazil
 Thrasya seminuda A.G.Burm. - Mato Grosso
 Thrasya setosa Swallen - Amazonas State in Venezuela
 Thrasya stricta A.G.Burm. - Amazonas State in Venezuela, Amazonas State in Brazil
 Thrasya thrasyoides (Trin.) Chase - Brazil, Bolivia
 Thrasya trinitensis Mez - Trinidad & Tobago, Venezuela, Guyana, Brazil, Colombia, Central America

References

Poaceae genera
Panicoideae

nl:Thrasya